The 2017–18 Ohio Bobcats women's basketball team represents Ohio University during the 2017–18 NCAA Division I women's basketball season. The Bobcats, led by fifth year head coach Bob Boldon, play its home games at the Convocation Center in Athens, Ohio as a member of the Mid-American Conference. They finished the season 16–15, 9–9 in MAC play to finish in third place in the East Division. They advanced to the quarterfinals of the MAC women's tournament where they lost to Miami (OH).

Preseason
The preseason coaches' poll and league awards were announced by the league office on October 25, 2017. Ohio was picked third in the MAC East

Preseason women's basketball coaches poll
(First place votes in parenthesis)

East Division
 Buffalo (10) 69
 Kent State (1) 52
 Ohio (1) 47
 Miami 40
 Bowling Green 23
 Akron 21

West Division
 Central Michigan (10) 70
 Toledo (1) 60
 Ball State (1) 46
 Western Michigan 32
 Northern Illinois 29
 Eastern Michigan 15

Regular Season Champion
Central Michigan (10), Ball State (1), Buffalo (1)

Tournament champs
Central Michigan (9), Ball State (1), Buffalo (1), Western Michigan (1)

Preseason All-MAC 

Source

Roster

Schedule

|-
!colspan=9 style=| Exhibition

|-
!colspan=9 style=| Non-conference regular season

|-
!colspan=9 style=| MAC regular season

|-
!colspan=9 style=| MAC Women's Tournament

Awards and Honors

Weekly Awards

All-MAC Awards 

Source

See also
2017–18 Ohio Bobcats men's basketball team

References

Ohio
Ohio Bobcats women's basketball seasons
Ohio Bobcats women's basketball
Ohio Bobcats women's basketball